Saint-Front is a commune in the Haute-Loire department in south-central France.

Geography
The river Lignon du Velay forms most of the commune's southeastern border.

Population

Gallery

See also
Communes of the Haute-Loire department

References

Saintfront